S115 may refer to :
 Greek submarine Katsonis (S-115) (1973-1993), a Tench class submarine
 SMS S115, a Großes Torpedoboot 1916 class torpedo boat of the Deutschen Kaiserliche Marine
 S115 road in Amsterdam